This is a list of notable Spanish artists who were born in or after 1501 and in or before 1800.

For artists born before 1501, see List of Spanish artists (born 1300–1500). For artists born after 1800, see List of Spanish artists.

Born 1501–1550 
Cristóbal de Acevedo (1540–1585) Painter
Miguel Barroso (1538–1590) Painter
Gaspar Becerra (1520–1570) Painter 
Pedro de Bolduque (16th century) Sculptor
Nicolás Borrás (1530–1610) Painter
Pedro Campaña (1503–1580) Painter 
Luis de Carbajal (1534–1613) Painter
Juan Bautista Castillo (1500–1579) Painter
Pablo de Céspedes (1538–1608) Painter 
Alonso Sánchez Coello (1531–1588) Painter 
Juan Correa de Vivar (1510–1566) Painter
Juan de Herrera (1530–1597) Architect
Jorge Inglés (1544–1585) Painter 
Juan de Juni (1507–1577) Sculptor 
Juan de Juanes (1510–1579) Painter 
Luis de Morales (1510–1586) Painter
Antonis Mor (1520–1586) Painter
Giovanni Narducci (1526–1616) Painter 
Juan Fernández Navarrete (1526–1579) Painter and sculptor
Diego de Pesquera (1540–1581) Sculptor 
Domenico Theotocopouli (1541–1614) Painter (El Greco) 
Luis de Vargas (1502–1568) Painter
Pedro de Villegas Marmolejo 1520–1597) Painter
Fernando Yáñez de la Almedina (1506–1526) Painter

Born 1551–1600 
Gregorio Bausá (1590–1676) Painter
Miquel Bestard (1592–1633) Painter
Antonio Bisquert (1596–1646) Painter
Andrea López Caballero (1647-?) Painter
Eugenio Caxés (1575–1634) Painter 
Patricio Caxés (?-1612) Painter
Bartolome Carducho (1560–1608) Painter
Vicente Carducho (1578–1638) Painter
Abdón Castañeda (1580–1629) Painter
Bartolomé de Cárdenas (1575–1628) Painter
Agustín del Castillo (1565–1626) Painter
Juan del Castillo (1584–1640) Painter
Bartolomeo Cavarozzi (1590–1625) Painter
Isabel Coello (?-1590) Painter 
Francisco de Comontes (?-1565) Painter
 (1587–1654) Painter
Francisco Collantes (1599–1656) Painter 
Juan Sánchez Cotán (1560–1627) Painter 
Giovanni Battista Crescenzi (1577–1635) Painter, Architect
Juan Pantoja de la Cruz (1553–1608) Painter 
Pedro de las Cuevas (1568–1635) Painter
Luis Tristán (1580–1624) Painter 
Antonio de Espinosa (1565–1630) Painter
Jerónimo Rodriguez de Espinosa (1562–1630) Painter
Juan de Espinosa (fl. 1628–1659) Painter, son of Juan Bautista de Espinosa (?)
Juan Bautista de Espinosa (1590–1641) Painter
Gregorio Fernández (1576–1636) Sculptor
Bartolomé González y Serrano (1564–1627) Painter 
Felipe de Guevara (?-1560) Art historian, collector
Juan van der Hamen (1596–1631) Painter 
Francisco Herrera the Elder (1590–1656) Painter
Juan Fernández el Labrador (fl. 1629–1636) Painter
Pablo Legote (1598–1671) Painter
Agustín Leonardo (fl. 1620s) Painter
Cristóbal Lloréns (fl. 1597) Painter
Juan Bautista Mayno (1578–1649) Painter 
Antonio Mohedano (1561–1625) Painter
Juan Martínez Montañés (1568–1649) Sculptor 
Angelo Nardi (1584–1660) Painter
Pedro de Obregón (1597–1659) Painter
Pedro Orrente (1580–1645) Painter 
Francisco Pacheco (1571–1654) Painter
Juan de Peñalosa (1581–1636) Painter
Andrea Ramirez (fl. 1555–1558) Painter, illuminator
Vicente Requena the Elder (fl. 1590) Painter
Francisco Ribalta (1565–1628) Painter
Juan Ribalta (1597–1628) Painter
Jusepe de Ribera (1591–1652) Painter
Juan de las Roelas (1558–1625) Painter
Juan Rizi (1595–1675) Painter
Bartolomé Román (1587–1647) Painter
Lazzaro Tavarone (1559–1631) Painter
Luis Tristán (1586–1640) Painter
Pedro Núñez del Valle (1597–1649) Painter
Francisco Varela (c.1580–1656) Painter
Cristóbal Vela (1598–1658) Painter
Diego Velázquez (1599–1660) Painter
Francisco de Zurbarán (1598–1664) Painter

Born 1601–1650 
Juan de Alfaro y Gomez (1640–1680) Painter
Andrés Amaya ( – 1704) Painter
José Antolínez (1635–1675) Painter
Francisco Antolínez (1644–1700) Painter
Cristobal Ramirez de Arellano (1630–1644) Painter 
Juan de Arellano (1614–1676) Painter
Francisco de Artiga (1650–1711) Painter
Sebastián Herrera Barnuevo (1619–1671) Painter 
Pedro Atanasio Bocanegra (1638–1688) Painter
Francisco de Burgos Mantilla (1612–1672) Painter 
Francisco Camilo (1610–1671) Painter
Alonzo Cano (1601–1667) Painter/Sculptor
Francisco Caro (1627–1667) Painter
Juan Carreño de Miranda (1614–1685) Painter
Felix Castello (1602–1656) Painter  
Antonio del Castillo y Saavedra (1616–1668) Painter
Gregorio Castaneda (?-1629) Painter 
Antonio Castrejon (1625–1690) Painter
Mateo Cerezo (1635–1685) Painter
Miguel Jerónimo de Cieza (1611–1685) Painter
Antonio Vela Cobo (1629–1675) Painter, sculptor
Claudio Coello (1642–1693) Painter
Pedro de Campolargo (1605–1675) Painter and engraver
Gabriel de la Corte (1648–1694) Painter
Antonio de Puga (1602–1648) Painter
Juan Antonio Escalante (1633–1670) Painter 
Juan Conchillos Falco (1641–1711) Painter
Vicente Salvador Gómez (1637–1700) Painter
Juan Simón Gutiérrez (1643–1718) Painter  
Francisco Herrera the Younger (1622–1685) Painter 
José de Ledesma (1630–1670) Painter
Jusepe Leonardo (1601–1652) Painter 
Juan de Licalde (17th century) Painter
Isaac Lievendal (17th century) Engraver
Esteban March (1610–1668) Painter 
Ambrosio Martínez Bustos (1614–1672) Painter 
Juan Bautista Martínez del Mazo (1612–1667) Painter
Andrés Marzo (fl. 17th century)
Pedro de Mena (1628–1688) Sculptor 
Juan Carreño de Miranda (1614–1685) Painter
Bartolomé Esteban Murillo (1617–1682) Painter 
Pedro Nuñez de Villavicencio (1640–1695) Painter 
Josefa de Óbidos (1630–1684) Painter 
Francisco Meneses Osorio (1640–1721) Painter 
Francisco de Palacios (1615–1650) Painter
Juan de Pareja (1610–1670) Painter 
Antonio de Pereda (1611–1678) Painter 
Francisco de Reyna (fl. 1659) Painter
Luisa Roldán (1650–1704) Sculptor
Juan de Valdés Leal (1622–1690) Painter 
Francisco Vera Cabeza de Vaca (1637–1700) Painter
Juan de Zurbarán (1620–1649) Painter

Born 1651–1700 
Teodoro Ardemans (c.1661–1726) Painter
Isidoro Arredondo (1653–1702) Painter
Mosen Vicente Bru (1682–1703) Painter
José de Cieza (1656–1692) Painter
Pablo González Velázquez (1664–1727) Sculptor
Michel Ange Houasse (1675–1730) Painter
Ignacio de León Salcedo (fl. 1655–1685) Painter 
Andres Leyto (fl. 1680s) Painter
Francisco Llamas (fl. 1700) Painter
Bernardo Germán de Llórente (1685–1759) Painter
Juan de Loaysa y Giron (fl. 17th century) Painter
Fernando Marquez Joya (?-1672) Painter
Esteban Márquez de Velasco (1652–1696) Painter
Juan Ramírez Mejandre (1680–1739) Sculptor
Juan García de Miranda (1677–1749) Painter
Nicolas García de Miranda (1698–1738) Painter
Antonio Palomino (1653–1725) Painter
Andrés Pérez (1660–1727) Painter
Juan Bautista Ravanals (1678-?) Engraver
Isidoro de Redondillo (fl. 1685) Painter
Alonso Miguel de Tovar (1678–1758) Painter
Clemente de Torres (1665–1730) Painter
Lucas de Valdés (1661–1724) Painter

Born 1701–1750 
Francisco Bayeu y Subías (1734–1795) Painter
Ramón Bayeu (1746–1793) Painter
Andrés de la Calleja (1705–1785) Painter
José Camarón Bonanat (1731–1803) Painter
Antonio Carnicero (1748–1814) Painter
José del Castillo (1737–1793) Painter
Françoise Duparc (1726–1778) Painter 
Corrado Giaquinto (1703–1765) Painter
Alejandro González Velázquez (1719–1772) Painter
Antonio González Velázquez (1729–1798) Painter
Luis González Velázquez (1715–1764) Painter
Francisco Goya (1746–1828) Painter/Printmaker 
Joaquin Inza (1736–1811) Painter 
Cristóbal de León (?-1729) Painter
Francisco Lopez y Palomino (fl. 18th century) Painter
José Luzán (1710–1785) Painter
Mariano Salvador Maella (1739–1819) Painter 
Luis Egidio Meléndez (1716–1780) Painter 
Luis Paret y Alcázar (1746–1799) Painter
Pedro Pozo (early 18th century – c. 1810) Painter
Lorenzo Quiros (1717–1789) Painter
Benevides Juan Ramirez (fl. 18th century) Painter
José de Ribera (1747–1787) Painter
José Ramírez de Arellano (1705–1770) Sculptor/Architect
Juan Ramírez de Arellano (1725–1782) Painter
José Romeo (1701–1772) Painter
Pedro de Uceda (?-1741) Painter
Cristóbal Valero (?-1789) Painter

Born 1751–1800 
José Aparicio (1773–1838) Painter 
Francisco Agustín y Grande (1753–1800) Painter
Valentín Carderera (1796–1880) Painter
Zacarías González Velázquez (1763–1834) Painter
Asensio Juliá (1760–1832) Painter
José de Madrazo y Agudo (1781–1859) Painter
Jerónimo Navases (1787–?) Painter
José Felipe Parra (1780–1846) Painter
Vicente López y Portaña (1772–1850) Painter 
Juan Antonio Ribera (1779–1860) Painter
José Roma (1784–1847) Painter
Joaquín Bernardo Rubert (1772–1817) Painter
Rafael Tegeo (1798–1856) Painter
Rafael Ximeno y Planes (1759–1825) Painter
José Antonio Zapata (1763–1837) Painter

Spanish artists
 List of Spanish artists (born 1500-1800)
Artists
Spanish artists